David Arch, better known as Dave Arch, is a British pianist, conductor, arranger and composer with a career covering albums, films and commercials, television and live performances. He is Musical Director and arranger for BBC Television's Strictly Come Dancing.

Early life
Arch's father was Gwyn Arch, a composer and choral director. Arch grew up in Sonning Common, near Henley-on-Thames, South Oxfordshire and attended Chiltern Edge School and King James College, Henley-on-Thames, and the Guildhall School of Music and Drama. He was a member of the National Youth Jazz Orchestra.

Career

Television career
Arch is best known for his role as Musical Director and arranger for BBC Television's Strictly Come Dancing, joining in 2006 after working as Musical Director on two series of Strictly Dance Fever, and Just the Two of Us. 
He was also Musical Director for recent productions of the Royal Variety Performance for ITV, including in 2021, the hundredth anniversary at the Royal Albert Hall, and for ITV's series Stepping Out and Popstar to Operastar.

In 2013, Arch was musical director and band leader for the television special When Miranda Met Bruce.

In 2015, he was the musical director and band leader for the Eurovision Song Contest's Greatest Hits special, commemorating the 60th anniversary of the Eurovision Song Contest.  That same year, he was the chairperson of the United Kingdom's national jury for the Eurovision Song Contest 2015.

Compositions
Arch  was commissioned to produce the original themes and stings for the British television broadcaster GMTV, broadcast between 1993 and 2010. Subsequent themes were all based on his original melody.

In 1986, Arch recorded a series of albums on red vinyl for UK-based Cavendish Music Library, which also featured Ray Russell on guitar. In 2005  Arch played keyboards for the Greg Lake Band.

In October 2016, Arch released his debut album Coming Home, consisting of his own compositions and including collaborations with his son, his father and "Strictly" colleague singer Tommy Blaize. The album was recorded and co-produced by Haydn Bendall at Abbey Road, Air, Rak and Strongroom studios.

References

External links
 
Discography at dave-arch.com
Filmography at dave-arch.com
TV credits at dave-arch.com

Living people
Strictly Come Dancing
British male composers
Year of birth missing (living people)
Alumni of the Guildhall School of Music and Drama